The Palm Treo  (stylized as Trēo) is a discontinued line of smartphones originally developed by Handspring, which was bought by Palm, Inc. They were then manufactured and maintained by Palm, Inc. Treos had a number of integrated features such as the ability to check the calendar while talking on the phone, dial directly from a list of contacts, and send email messages. The final models included a built-in camera. Treos ran Palm OS, but later models also ran Windows Mobile. The Palm Pre, released in June 2009, replaced the Treo series.

Treo devices
A total of nineteen Treo models were released, listed below in reverse chronological order. Treos through the 680 series used Palm OS.  Beginning with the 700 series, Treos ran both Palm OS and Windows Mobile. The Treo 700w was the first of the 700 line, and the first Treo to use Windows Mobile. On August 19, 2008, Palm released the last Treo device, the Treo Pro on GSM. The Treo Pro on CDMA began sales in March 2009.

Officially announced models:

References

Palm mobile phones
Mobile phones with an integrated hardware keyboard